Älvsborgs FF is a Swedish football club located in Västra Frölunda.

Background
Älvsborgs FF currently (2016) plays in Division 3 Sydvästra Götaland which is the fifth tier of Swedish football. They play their home matches at the Påvelundsplan in Västra Frölunda.

The club is affiliated to Göteborgs Fotbollförbund. Älvsborgs FF have competed in the Svenska Cupen on 5 occasions and have played 7 matches in the competition. They played in the 2011 Svenska Cupen but lost 1–3 at home to IFK Fjärås in the preliminary round.

Season to season

Footnotes

External links
 Älvsborgs FF – Official website

Alvsborg FF
Football clubs in Västra Götaland County